Going the Limit is a 1926 American silent comedy film directed by Chester Withey and starring George O'Hara, Sally Long and Brooks Benedict. It is loosely inspired by the plot of George Barr McCutcheon's Brewster's Millions, also featuring a central character who is trying to lose money.

Synopsis
Gordon Emery hopes to marry the wealthy Estelle Summers but is ashamed of his own lack of money.  He then hears that he is the sole heir of a fortune of two million dollars from his uncle. Estelle refuses to marry him, however, unless he loses all of it. Convinced that the best way to do this will be to get arrested and compel his uncle to disinherit him, he tries a to get arrested in a variety of ways but keeps failing to do so and is even commended for preventing a bank robbery.

Cast
 George O'Hara as 	Gordon Emery
 Sally Long as 	Estelle Summers
 Brooks Benedict as 	George Stanways
 Tom Ricketts as 	Mortimer Harden
 Murdock MacQuarrie as 	Simson Windsor

References

Bibliography
 Connelly, Robert B. The Silents: Silent Feature Films, 1910-36, Volume 40, Issue 2. December Press, 1998.
 Munden, Kenneth White. The American Film Institute Catalog of Motion Pictures Produced in the United States, Part 1. University of California Press, 1997.

External links
 

1926 films
1926 comedy films
1920s English-language films
American silent feature films
Silent American comedy films
American black-and-white films
Films directed by Chester Withey
Film Booking Offices of America films
1920s American films